The surname Eisenberger may refer to:

 Georg Eisenberger (1863 - 1945), a German politician
 Severin Eisenberger (1879 - 1945), a Jewish Polish-born concert pianist and teacher
 Jenö Eisenberger (1922 - 2016), a Hungarian-Austrian employer
 Fred Eisenberger (born 1952), a Canadian politician
 Gábor Péter, born Eisenberger Benjámin (or Auspitz Benő) (1906 - 1993)
 Sylvia Eisenberger, Austrian actress

See also 
 Eisenberg (disambiguation)

German-language surnames
Jewish surnames